Isaac Woodard Jr. (March 18, 1919 – September 23, 1992) was an American soldier and victim of racial violence. An African-American World War II veteran, on February 12, 1946, hours after being honorably discharged from the United States Army, he was attacked while still in uniform by South Carolina police as he was taking a bus home. The attack and his injuries sparked national outrage and galvanized the civil rights movement in the United States.

The attack left Woodard completely and permanently blind. Due to South Carolina's reluctance to pursue the case, President Harry S. Truman ordered a federal investigation. The police chief, Lynwood Shull, was indicted and went to trial in federal court in South Carolina, where he was acquitted by an all-white jury.

Such miscarriages of justice by state governments influenced a move towards civil rights initiatives at the federal level. Truman subsequently established a national interracial commission, made a historic speech to the NAACP and the nation in June 1947 in which he described civil rights as a moral priority, submitted a civil rights bill to Congress in February 1948, and issued Executive Orders 9980 and 9981 on June 26, 1948, desegregating the armed forces and the federal government.

Early life and military service
Woodard was born in Fairfield County, South Carolina, and grew up in Goldsboro, North Carolina. He attended local segregated schools, often underfunded for African Americans during the Jim Crow years.

On October 14, 1942, the 23-year-old Woodard enlisted in the United States Army at Fort Jackson in Columbia, South Carolina. He served in the Pacific theater in a labor battalion as a longshoreman and was promoted to sergeant. He earned a battle star for his Asiatic–Pacific Campaign Medal by unloading ships under enemy fire in New Guinea, and received the Good Conduct Medal as well as the Service medal and World War II Victory Medal awarded to all American participants. He received an honorable discharge.

Attack and maiming
On February 12, 1946, Woodard was on a Greyhound Lines bus traveling from Camp Gordon in Augusta, Georgia, where he had been discharged, en route to rejoin his family in North Carolina. When the bus reached a rest stop just outside Augusta, Woodard asked the bus driver if there was time for him to use a restroom. The driver grudgingly acceded to the request after an argument. Woodard returned to his seat from the rest stop without incident, and the bus departed.

The bus stopped in Batesburg (now Batesburg-Leesville, South Carolina), near Aiken. Though Woodard had caused no disruption (other than the earlier argument), the driver contacted the local police (including Chief Lynwood Shull), who forcibly removed Woodard from the bus. After demanding to see his discharge papers, a number of Batesburg policemen, including Shull, took Woodard to a nearby alleyway, where they beat him repeatedly with nightsticks. They then took Woodard to the town jail and arrested him for disorderly conduct, accusing him of drinking beer in the back of the bus with other soldiers.

Newspaper accounts vary on what happened next (and accounts sometimes spelled his name as "Woodward"), but author and attorney Michael R. Gardner said in 2003:

In none of the papers is there any suggestion there was verbal or physical violence on the part of Sergeant Woodard. It's quite unclear what really happened. What did happen with certainty is the next morning when the sun came up, Sergeant Isaac Woodard was blind for life.

During the course of the night in jail, Shull beat and blinded Woodard, who later stated in court that he was beaten for saying "Yes" instead of "Yes, sir". He also had partial amnesia as a result of his injuries. Woodard further testified that he was punched in the eyes by police several times on the way to the jail, and later repeatedly jabbed in his eyes with a billy club.
Newspaper accounts indicate that Woodard's eyes had been "gouged out"; historical documents indicate that each globe was ruptured irreparably in the socket.

The following morning, the Batesburg police sent Woodard before the local judge, who found him guilty and fined him fifty dollars. The soldier requested medical assistance, but it took two more days for a doctor to be sent to him. Not knowing where he was and still experiencing amnesia, Woodard ended up in a hospital in Aiken, receiving substandard medical care. Three weeks after he was reported missing by his relatives, Woodard was discovered in the hospital. He was immediately rushed to an Army hospital in Spartanburg. Though his memory had begun to recover by that time, doctors found both eyes were damaged beyond repair.

National outcry
Although the case was not widely reported at first, it was soon extensively covered in major national newspapers. The National Association for the Advancement of Colored People (NAACP) worked to publicize Woodard's plight, and it also lobbied the state government of South Carolina to address the incident, which it dismissed.

On his ABC radio show Orson Welles Commentaries, actor and filmmaker Orson Welles crusaded for the punishment of Shull and his accomplices. On the broadcast which was made on July 28, 1946, Welles read an affidavit which was sent to him by the NAACP and signed by Woodard. He criticized the lack of action by the South Carolina government as intolerable and shameful. Woodard was the focus of Welles's four subsequent broadcasts. "The NAACP felt that these broadcasts did more than anything else to prompt the Justice Department to act on the case," wrote the Museum of Broadcasting in a 1988 exhibit on Welles.

Musicians wrote songs about Woodard and the attack. A month after the beating, the calypso artist Lord Invader recorded an anti-racism song for his album Calypso at Midnight; it was entitled "God Made Us All", with the last line of the song directly referring to the incident. Later that year, folk artist Woody Guthrie recorded "The Blinding of Isaac Woodard," which he wrote for his album The Great Dust Storm. He said that he wrote the song "...so's you wouldn't be forgetting what happened to this famous Negro soldier less than three hours after he got his Honorable Discharge down in Atlanta...."

Federal government's response
On September 19, 1946, seven months after the incident, NAACP Executive Secretary Walter Francis White met with President Harry S. Truman in the Oval Office to discuss the Woodard case. Gardner writes that when Truman "heard this story in the context of the state authorities of South Carolina doing nothing for seven months, he exploded." The following day, Truman wrote a letter to Attorney General Tom C. Clark demanding that action be taken to address South Carolina's reluctance to try the case. Six days later, on September 26, Truman directed the Justice Department to open an investigation.

A short investigation followed, and on October 2, Shull and several of his officers were indicted in U.S. District Court in Columbia. It was within federal jurisdiction because the beating had occurred at a bus stop on federal property and at the time Woodard was in uniform of the armed services. The case was presided over by Judge Julius Waties Waring.

By all accounts, the trial was a travesty. The local U.S. Attorney charged with handling the case failed to interview anyone except the bus driver, a decision that Waring, a civil rights proponent, believed was a gross dereliction of duty. Waring later wrote of being disgusted at the way the case was handled at the local level, commenting, "I was shocked by the hypocrisy of my government ...in submitting that disgraceful case".

The defense did not perform better. When the defense attorney began to shout racial epithets at Woodard, Waring stopped him immediately. During the trial, the defense attorney stated to the all-white jury that "if you rule against Shull, then let this South Carolina secede again." (Due to disfranchisement of blacks in the South, they were also excluded from juries.) After Woodard gave his account of the events, Shull firmly denied it. He claimed that Woodard had threatened him with a gun and that Shull had used his nightclub in self-defense. During this testimony, Shull admitted that he repeatedly struck Woodard in the eyes.

On November 5, after 30 minutes of deliberation (15, according to at least one news report), the jury found Shull not guilty on all charges, despite his admission that he had blinded Woodard. The courtroom broke into applause upon hearing the verdict. The failure to convict Shull was perceived as a political failure by the Truman administration.

Woodard moved north after the trial during the Second Great Migration and lived in the New York City area for the rest of his life. He died aged 73 in the Veterans Administration hospital in the Bronx on September 23, 1992. He was buried with military honors at the Calverton National Cemetery (Section 15, Site 2180) in Calverton, New York.

Aftermath

Influence on American politics
In December 1946, after meeting with White and other leaders of the NAACP, and a month after the jury acquitted Shull, Truman established the Civil Rights Commission by Executive Order 9808; a fifteen-member, interracial group, including the President of General Electric, Charles E. Wilson; academics such as John Sloan Dickey from Dartmouth College; and Sadie Tanner Alexander, a black attorney for the city of Philadelphia, as well as other activists. He asked them to report by the end of 1947.

Truman made a strong speech on civil rights on June 29, 1947, to the NAACP, the first American president to speak to their meeting, which was broadcast by radio from where they met on the steps of the Lincoln Memorial. The President said that civil rights were a moral priority, and it was his priority for the federal government. He had seen by Woodard's and other cases that the issue could not be left to state and local governments. He said:

It is my deep conviction that we have reached a turning point in our country's efforts to guarantee freedom and equality to all our citizens. Recent events in the United States and abroad have made us realize that it is more important today than ever before to ensure that all Americans enjoy these rights. When I say all Americans—I mean all Americans.

On February 2, 1948, Truman sent the first comprehensive civil rights bill to Congress. It incorporated many of the thirty-five recommendations of his commission. In July 1948, over the objection of senior military officers, Truman issued Executive Order 9981, banning racial discrimination in the U.S. Armed Forces, and Executive Order 9980 to integrate the federal government. (Facilities had been segregated under President Woodrow Wilson). This was in response to a number of incidents against black veterans, most notably the Woodard case. The armed forces and federal agencies led the way in the United States for integration of the workplace, public facilities, and schools. Over the decades, the decision meant that both institutions benefited from the contributions of minorities.

Nevertheless, polls showed opposition to Truman's civil rights efforts. They likely cost him some support in his 1948 reelection bid against Thomas Dewey. Although Truman narrowly won, Gardner believes that his continued championing of civil rights as a federal priority cost him much support, especially in the Solid South. Southern Democrats had long exercised outsize political power in Congress, having disfranchised most blacks there since the turn of the 20th century, but benefiting by apportionment based on total population. Truman's efforts threatened other changes since numerous communities across the country had restrictive covenants that were racially discriminatory. Because of his low approval ratings and because of a bad showing in early primaries, Truman chose not to seek re-election in 1952, though he could have done so. He had been exempted from the term limitations which are imposed by the 22nd amendment.

Influence on popular culture
Welles revisited the Woodard case on the May 7, 1955, broadcast of his BBC TV series, Orson Welles' Sketch Book. Woody Guthrie later recalled: "I sung 'The Blinding of Isaac Woodard' in the Lewisohn Stadium (in New York City) one night for more than 36,000 people, and I got the loudest applause I've ever got in my whole life."

In January 2019, a new book about the Woodard case and its aftermath, Unexampled Courage: The Blinding of Sgt. Isaac Woodard and the Awakening of President Harry S. Truman and Judge J. Waties Waring, was published; it was written by Federal Judge Richard Gergel.

Other events
Woodard's "drunk and disorderly" conviction was vacated in 2018.

A group of veterans which was led by Don North, a retired Army major from Carrollton, Georgia, received permission to erect a historical marker in honor of Woodard in Batesburg-Leesville in South Carolina. In 2019 the marker was unveiled. The bottom part of the marker was written in Braille.

See also

Medgar Evers
Harry T. Moore
Murder of Harry and Harriette Moore
Murder of James Byrd Jr.
Philleo Nash
The Scottsboro Boys
Ossian Sweet
Emmett Till
Booker T. Spicely
George Floyd
George Stinney
Rodney King
Human rights in the United States
Incarceration in the United States
Lynching in the United States
African-American veterans lynched after World War I
Military history of African Americans
Murder of Lemuel Penn
Police brutality in the United States
Race and crime in the United States
Race in the United States criminal justice system
Racial bias in criminal news in the United States
Racial profiling#In the United States
Racism against African Americans 
Racism in the United States
Use of torture by police in the United States

References

Further reading
Egerton, John. Speak Now Against the Day, Chapel Hill: The University of North Carolina Press, 1994.
Gardner, Michael. Harry Truman and Civil Rights: Moral Courage and Political Risks, Carbondale and Edwardsville: Southern Illinois Press, 2002.
Yarborough, Tinsley. A Passion for Justice: J. Waties Waring and Civil Rights, New York: Oxford University Press, 1987.
Gergel, Richard. Unexampled Courage: the Blinding of Sgt. Isaac Woodard and the Awakening of President Harry S. Truman and Judge J. Waties Waring, FSG, 2019.

External links
Picture of Isaac Woodard
Andrew Myers, Resonant Ripples in a Global Pond: The Blinding of Isaac Woodard, website includes associated primary documents - Isaac Woodard court transcripts, military documentation, et al., paper/website for 2002 American Studies Association conference
The blinding of Isaac Woodard 
J. Elkins, "Practical Moral Philosophy for Lawyers" - discusses Woodard case in some detail
Interview with Truman about Philleo Nash History, Oral History, Truman Library website
"The Blinding of Isaac Woodard" - from the History in Song website

1946 "ABC Lear Radio - Orson Welles Commentaries" including 6 episodes devoted or mentioning the case of Isaac Woodard

1919 births
1992 deaths
African-American United States Army personnel
African-American-related controversies
United States Army personnel of World War II
American blind people
Burials at Calverton National Cemetery
Civil rights movement
Crimes in South Carolina
People from Fairfield County, South Carolina
Law enforcement controversies in the United States
Police brutality in the United States
Race-related controversies in the United States
Racially motivated violence against African Americans
Terrorism in the United States
United States Army soldiers
Victims of police brutality in the United States
White nationalist terrorism
African Americans in World War II